Feel the Love may refer to:

 "Feel the Love" (Rudimental song), 2012
 "Feel the Love" (Ayumi Hamasaki song), 2013
 "Feel the Love" (Kids See Ghosts song), 2018
 "Feel the Love" (Daði Freyr and Ásdís song), 2021
 "Feel the Love (Oomachasaooma)", a 1983 song by 10cc
 "Feel the Love", a 2022 song by Riker Lynch which represented Colorado in the American Song Contest